Nyika Nysanu Kyle Vohnnel Williams (ニカ・ニサヌ・カイル・ヴォネル・ウィリアムス, born July 9, 1987) is a Vincent-born Japanese professional basketball player for Shimane Susanoo Magic in Japan. He got a Japanese citizenship on April 19, 2019. He is difficult to guard because of his long arms and jumping ability.

High school career
He joined his brother, Burton Williams Jr., in America, playing 12 months at Monsignor McClancey High School. Averaged 14.6 points,  5.4 rebounds, 75.0 percent free throw.

College career
He played two years for Barton County Community College in Great Bend, KS,  then, earned a scholarship to play at Pacific.

College statistics

|-
| style="text-align:left;"| 2007-08
| style="text-align:left;"| Barton
| 28 || 6 || 17 || .591 || .000 || .608|| 5.5 ||0.5  || 1.0 || 0.9 || 6.5
|-
| style="text-align:left;"| 2008-09
| style="text-align:left;"| Barton
| 33 || 32 || 25.9 || .695 || .000 || .660|| 9.2 ||0.4  || 0.88 || 2.0 || 15.4
|-
| style="text-align:left;"| 2009-10
| style="text-align:left;"| Pacific
| 35 || 0 || 7.1 || .562 || .000 || .645|| 1.71 ||0.14  || 0.37 || 0.26 || 2.63
|-
| style="text-align:left;"| 2010-11
| style="text-align:left;"| Pacific
| 31 ||26 || 18.0 || .565 || .000 || .553 || 4.35 ||0.19  ||0.42 || 0.68|| 8.10
|-

Professional career
He was voted AfroBasket.com All-Tunisian League Defensive Player of the Year in 2014.

Career statistics

Regular season

|-
| align="left" |  2011-12
| align="left" | Takamatsu
| 50 || 24 || 24.3 || .554 || --- || .635 || 8.1 || 0.5 || 1.1 || 0.9 ||  13.2
|-
| align="left" |  2012-13
| align="left" | Saint-Étienne
| 16 ||  ||  ||  ||  ||  || 6.6 ||  ||  ||  ||  9.5
|-
| align="left" | 2012-13
| align="left" | Gunma
| 15 || 10 || 21.2 || .443 || --- || .632 || 6.3 || 0.7 || 0.8 || 0.5 ||  9.6 
|-
| align="left" |  2012-13
| align="left" | Saitama
| 40 ||  || 28.2 || .563 || .000 || .623 || 12.2 || 1.2 || 1.4 || 0.6 ||  13.5
|-

| align="left" |  2014-15
| align="left" | Saitama
| 34|| || 28.2|| .571|| .000|| .644|| 9.7|| 1.4|| 1.5|| 1.2||16.4
|-

| align="left" | 2015-16
| align="left" | Hiroshima D
| 53 ||3 ||14.4 ||.567 ||.000 ||.584 ||4.4 ||0.4 ||0.6 ||0.5 ||7.0 
|-
| align="left" | 2016-17
| align="left" | Kagawa
| 57||2 || 13.7||.506 ||.000 ||.504 ||4.5 ||0.5 ||0.5 ||0.8 ||6.6
|-
| align="left" |  2017-18
| align="left" | Ehime
|54 ||36 || 19.9|| bgcolor="CFECEC"|.626* || .000||.543 ||7.1 ||0.7 ||0.9 ||0.8 ||13.8
|-
| align="left" |  2018-19
| align="left" | Akita
|2 || 1||21.0 ||.500 ||.000 ||.556 ||4.5 ||1.0 ||0.0 || 0.5||13.5 
|-
| align="left" |  2018-19
| align="left" | Fukushima
|12 || 12||27.1 ||.571 ||.000 ||.592 ||7.5 ||1.2 ||1.2 || 0.7|| 18.3 
|-
| align="left" |  2019-20
| align="left" | Akita
|39 || 1||17.0 ||.559 ||.000 ||.592 ||5.3 ||0.7 ||0.9|| 0.5|| 8.1
|-

National team

|-
| align="left" |  2014
| align="left" | St. Vincent
|5|| || 31.2|| .516|| .000|| .742|| 6.6||1.4 || 1.6|| 1.8|| 22
|-

| align="left" |  2015
| align="left" | St. Vincent
|6|| ||27.17|| .404|| .000|| .500|| 6.5||2.5 || 1.83|| 0.67|| 9.3
|-
| align="left" |  2019
| align="left" | Japan
|8||0 ||13.4|| .459|| .000|| .560|| 5.6||0.4 || 0.4|| 0.8|| 6.0
|-

Early cup games

|-
| align="left" |  2019
| align="left" | Akita
|2|| 0|| 17:39|| .786|| .000|| .500|| 8.0||1.0 || 0.0|| 0.0|| 12.5
|-

Preseason games

|-
| align="left" |2018
| align="left" | Akita
| 2 || 0 || 14.3 || .696 ||.000  || .400||9.0 || 0.5|| 0.0 || 0.0 ||  17.0
|-
| align="left" |2019
| align="left" | Akita
| 3 || 0 || 14.7 || .500 ||.000  || .571||4.7 || 0.0|| 1.0 || 1.3 ||  6.67
|-

Source: Changwon1Changwon2
Source: UtsunomiyaToyamaSendai

Personal
He is the son of Burton Williams and Georgina Placida Williams. Nyika is the third of four children born to his parents.

Siblings:
Burton B. Williams Jr./
Dr. Enyinne Williams/
Zena Williams

Spouse: Yuko Williams on March 18, 2015- Current.

Children: Kyle Williams(海瑠).

Trivia
He can sing with a guitar. He appeared in commercial for Ryukakusan.

References

External links
Williams on Youtube

Stats in Japan
Pacific Tigers bio
Williams with Takamatsu
 Finale Coupe de Tunisie

1987 births
Living people
Akita Northern Happinets players
Barton Cougars men's basketball players
Ehime Orange Vikings players
Fukushima Firebonds players
Gunma Crane Thunders players
Hiroshima Dragonflies players
Japanese men's basketball players
Japanese people of Saint Vincent and the Grenadines descent
Kagawa Five Arrows players
Pacific Tigers men's basketball players
Saint Vincent and the Grenadines men's basketball players
Saitama Broncos players
Centers (basketball)
JS Kairouan basketball players